"Something Wonderful" is a show tune from the 1951 Rodgers and Hammerstein musical The King and I.

The song was introduced in the Broadway production by Dorothy Sarnoff in the role of Lady Thiang, the King's head wife. In the 1956 film adaptation "Something Wonderful" was sung by Terry Saunders in the role of Lady Thiang: Saunders was the understudy for Sarnoff in the Broadway production and, in 1952, had taken over the role when Sarnoff departed.

"Something Wonderful" is sung by Lady Thiang to Anna Leonowens to persuade her to accept the King for what he is, despite his faults. In a sense, these lyrics have echoes of the song "What's the Use of Wond'rin'" from the Rodgers and Hammerstein musical Carousel, which also deals with the issue of women standing by their husbands despite all their faults. Musically, the heavy chords that punctuate the accompaniment bear some pre-echoes of the song "Climb Ev'ry Mountain" from The Sound of Music. This is notable because both these songs are inspirational songs sung by the earth-mother characters, who have similar singing voices. Both songs are also the last songs heard in their respective shows, even though "Something Wonderful" is played as an instrumental rendition to underscore the final scene of the King at his deathbed. In the film version of The King and I an unseen chorus sings the final verse of "Something Wonderful" as the film concludes.

A most recent occurrence of the song is when it is sung as a tragic satire near the end of the 2020 movie, Promising Young Woman.

Recordings
 Shirley Bassey – Shirley Stops the Shows (1964)
 Bing Crosby – recorded April 9, 1951 with Victor Young and His Orchestra.
 Doris Day – What Every Girl Should Know (1960)
 Carmen McRae – Something Wonderful (1962)
 Liza Minnelli – Liza's Back (2002)
 Bernadette Peters – Bernadette Peters Loves Rodgers and Hammerstein (2002)
 Carly Simon – My Romance (1990)
 Nina Simone – Broadway-Blues-Ballads (1964)
 Barbra Streisand – The Broadway Album
 Bryn Terfel - Something Wonderful: Bryn Terfel Sings Rodgers & Hammerstein (1996)

References

1951 songs
Songs from The King and I
Nina Simone songs
Liza Minnelli songs
Songs with music by Richard Rodgers
Songs with lyrics by Oscar Hammerstein II
Barbra Streisand songs